Kylie Watson (born 7 May 1978) is an Australian actress, interior designer and model. She is best known for playing Shauna Bradley in the Australian soap opera Home and Away between 1999 and 2002. She is now a successful interior designer.

Career
In her teens, Watson was an international model, travelling to Asia for several contracts.

In February 1999, Watson received an audition for Home and Away. However, she decided not to attend the audition because she did not think she stood a chance of winning the part. Her agent persuaded her to change her mind and she went on to receive the role of Shauna Bradley. It was her first acting role and she revealed "So at that point, I thought 'What am I going to do? I've never done this before, never acted in my life.' My agent booked me into acting classes – I think I had about eight weeks before I started so I was absolutely petrified. I think I was really bad, to be honest, at the beginning. But like anything if you really put your mind to it and love what you do, you invest the time to grow and educate yourself and I did do that."

After leaving Home and Away in 2002, Watson completed a diploma in interior design. She began her own business called KW Design.

In 2009, Watson starred in Lightswitch, a short film directed by Emma Keltie and written by Natalie Krikowa and Penny Glasswell. The film played at various LGBT festivals.

Personal life
Watson is lesbian. She came out in an issue of Cherrie magazine in March 2008. Watson told Katrina Fox "I've never made a point of letting people know about my sexuality because I've never thought it was relevant, but it's who I am and I'm not ashamed of it. However in saying that, I think in this particular day it's a lot easier to be identified as a not-so-straight woman particularly with The L Word series out where it's glamorised if you like; it's almost a bit of a fad like we're in fashion."

Filmography

References

External links
 

Australian soap opera actresses
Australian interior designers
1978 births
Living people
Australian lesbian actresses